The Iran national football team, recognised by FIFA as IR Iran, represents Iran in international football and is controlled by the Football Federation Islamic Republic of Iran (FFIRI).

At the continental level, Iran has won three Asian Cup championships in 1968, 1972 and 1976. The nation's best performance at the Olympics was reaching the quarterfinals at the 1976 Montreal Games. At the FIFA World Cup, Iran have qualified six times (1978, 1998, 2006, 2014, 2018 and 2022) but have never progressed beyond the group stages; they have however, won three matches: against the United States in 1998, Morocco in 2018 and Wales in 2022.

History

Early years

The Iranian Football Federation was founded in 1920. In 1926, Tehran XI (selected players from Tehran Club, Toofan F.C. and Armenian Sports Club) traveled across the border to Baku, USSR, this was the first away football match for an Iranian team. This Tehran Select team is the predecessor of Iran's national football team.

The first match that Team Melli played was on 23 August 1941, away at Kabul in a 1–0 win against British India while Iran's first FIFA international match was on 25 August 1941, away at Afghanistan. Iran won the Asian Cup three consecutive times (1968, 1972, 1976) to which the team has not been able to add since.

In 1978, Iran made its first appearance in the World Cup after defeating Australia in Tehran. Iran lost two of three group stage matches against the Netherlands and Peru. Team Melli managed to surprise some in the footballing community by securing one point in its first ever World Cup appearance against Scotland which saw Iraj Danaeifard cancel out an own goal scored by Andranik Eskandarian for the 1–1 draw.

After the 1979 Revolution 
After the 1979 Revolution, football was somewhat neglected and cast aside. During the 1980s, the Iranian national team did not feature in World Cup competitions due to the Iran–Iraq War (1980–88) and domestic football embraced the inevitable effects of conflict. The national team withdrew from the Asian qualifiers for the 1982 World Cup and refused to participate in the qualifiers for the 1986 World Cup because of having to play on neutral ground. The war and political upheavals left Iran without major club competitions until 1989 when the Qods League was established. A year later, the Qods League was renamed the Azadegan League. Despite failing to qualify for both the 1990 and 1994 World Cups, it was said that during this period, a number of quality players burst onto the Iranian football scene laying the foundation for third place in the 1996 AFC Asian Cup (victories in that tournament included a 3–0 victory against Saudi Arabia and a 6–2 victory against South Korea) and their second stab at World Cup glory in 1998.

1998–2006

In November 1997, Iran qualified for the 1998 World Cup after eliminating Australia in a close playoff series. After being tied 3–3 on aggregate, Iran advanced due to the away goals rule; Iran held Australia to a 1–1 draw at home, and a 2–2 draw in Melbourne.

At their first game at the 1998 FIFA World Cup against Yugoslavia, Iran lost 1–0 to a free kick by Siniša Mihajlović. Iran recorded their first World Cup victory in the second game beating and eliminating the United States 2–1 with Hamid Estili and Mehdi Mahdavikia scoring goals for Iran. The Iran-US World Cup match was preheated with certain excitement because of each country's political stance after the Iranian revolution and the Iran hostage crisis. However, in an act of defiance against all forms of hatred or politics in sports, both sides presented one another with gifts and flowers and took ceremonial pictures before the match kickoff.

Iran played against Germany in the third game, losing 2–0 courtesy of goals from Oliver Bierhoff and Jürgen Klinsmann, finishing third in the group.

Iran finished first in the group stage of the 2000 Asia Cup but lost to South Korea in the quarter-finals. They failed to qualify for World Cup 2002, held in Asia for the first time, after an aggregate defeat to the Republic of Ireland, losing 2–0 in Dublin and winning 1–0 in Tehran. The elimination saw manager Miroslav Blažević step down from the top spot to be replaced by his assistant Branko Ivanković who stepped up from assistant coach.

After qualifying to the Asian Cup 2004, Iran was drawn with Thailand, Oman and Japan in the tournament. Iran finished second in the group. In the quarter-final clash against South Korea, Iran won 4–3. They then lost to host China on penalty kicks, and won against Bahrain 4–2 to finish third place in the tournament.

On 8 June 2005, Iran and Japan became the first countries other than hosts Germany to qualify for the 2006 World Cup.

The Iran-Japan leg of the 2006 World Cup qualifiers in Tehran, played on 24 March 2005, was the highest attended qualifying match among all confederations. The match ended with five fans dead and several others injured as they left the Azadi Stadium at the end of the match.

Iran started their Germany 2006 appearance with a match against North America's Mexico in Group D. Being 1–1 at half-time, defensive mistakes led to a Mexican 3–1 win, with goals from Omar Bravo and Sinha. Yahya Golmohammadi scored the only Iranian goal.

Iran played against Portugal in the second game, losing 2–0. The goals were scored by Deco and a penalty from Cristiano Ronaldo. Iran were eliminated from the competition before their third and final game against Angola, a 1–1 draw.

Temporary suspension
In November 2006, Iran was suspended by FIFA from all participation in international football on the grounds of governmental interference in the national football association. The ban lasted less than a month and as a dispensation was given to allow the Iran under-23 team to participate in the football competition of the 2006 Asian Games, fixtures were unaffected.

2007–14

The IRIFF appointed Amir Ghalenoei as manager of Iran on 17 July 2006 to succeed Branko Ivanković. After finishing first in the 2007 Asian Cup qualifying round two points ahead of South Korea, Iran placed first in the group stage of the final tournament in Malaysia, eventually losing to their qualifying opponents in a penalty shoot-out in the quarterfinals. After a period of discussion in the Iranian football federation, his contract was not renewed and Team Melli was left with a caretaker manager for several months.

Then-leading international goalscorer Ali Daei was chosen to become the new manager after Spanish coach Javier Clemente had been closer to signing on as Iran's national team manager, when talks collapsed when he refused to live full-time in the country. Iran was placed with Kuwait, Syria and United Arab Emirates in the third round of 2010 World Cup qualifying. Ali Daei resigned from his position as the Iranian national coach on 29 March 2009, replaced by Afshin Ghotbi. Iran failed to qualify for the 2010 World Cup after finishing fourth overall in its group.

During the final game of the 2010 FIFA World Cup qualifiers against South Korea in Seoul on 17 June 2009, seven members of the team wore green wristbands in support of the Iranian Green Movement during the 2009 Iranian election protests. Initial rumors and false reports were that all seven players were banned for life by the Iranian Football Federation, however, state-run media claimed that all seven had "retired". On 24 June 2009, FIFA wrote to Iran's Football Federation asking for clarification on the situation. The Iranian Football Federation replied that no disciplinary action has been taken against any player.

Iran renewed the contract with Afshin Ghotbi until the end of 2011 AFC Asian Cup and the team qualified to the tournament with 13 points as the group winners.

During the final qualification match against South Korea, several Iranian players started the match wearing green armbands or wristbands, a symbol of protest at the outcome of the Iranian presidential election. Most removed them at half-time. The newspaper Iran reported that Ali Karimi, Mehdi Mahdavikia, Hosein Kaebi and Vahid Hashemian had received life bans from the Iranian FA for the gesture. However, the Iranian FA denied this claim in a response to FIFA's inquiry saying that "the comments in foreign media are nothing but lies and a mischievous act." Head coach Afshin Ghotbi also confirmed that it was a rumour and Iranian FA "has not taken any official stand on this issue."

Afshin Ghotbi qualified Iran for the 2011 Asian Cup and finished second in the West Asian Football Federation Championship 2010 just a few months before the Asian Cup. Iran were able to gain all nine possible points in the group stage of the Asian Cup but after an extra time goal from South Korea, Iran were yet again eliminated from the quarter-finals.

On 4 April 2011, former Real Madrid manager Carlos Queiroz agreed to a two-and-a-half-year deal to coach the Iranian national team until the end of the 2014 FIFA World Cup in Brazil. Under Queiroz, Iran began their World Cup qualification campaign successfully, defeating the Maldives 4–0 in the first leg of their second round of qualifiers. After winning 5–0 on aggregate, Iran advanced to the third round of qualifiers where they were drawn with Indonesia, Qatar and Bahrain.

Iran highlighted their position at the top of their group by defeating Bahrain 6–0 at home in the Azadi Stadium as well as inviting former German youth international Ashkan Dejagah who scored twice on his debut against Qatar. After a 4–1 win at Indonesia, Iran qualified for the final round of direct qualifiers, the fourth round. In the fourth round, Iran played South Korea, Qatar, Uzbekistan and Lebanon in their group. Queiroz made new foreign-based additions to his squad, adding players such as Reza Ghoochannejhad to his team.

Iran started their fourth round of Asian qualifiers with a 1–0 win in Uzbekistan. Team Melli then drew Qatar and lost in Lebanon before defeating South Korea at the Azadi on 16 October with a goal from captain Javad Nekounam. After a 1–0 loss in Tehran against Uzbekistan, Iran defeated Qatar 1–0 in Doha and Lebanon 4–0 at home. In their last qualification match, Iran defeated South Korea 1–0 in Ulsan Munsu with a goal from Ghoochannejhad, clinching their ticket to Brazil as group winners with 16 points. Thus, Iran became the third team that Queiroz has managed to qualify for the World Cup, having reached the 2002 edition with South Africa and the 2010 edition with Portugal, leading the latter to a knockout stage finish. Iran continued their winning streak, securing qualification to the 2015 Asian Cup months later as well.

Since Queiroz's role as manager of the Iranian national team, he has been renowned for introducing players from the Iranian diaspora to the national squad. These players include German-Iranians Daniel Davari and Ashkan Dejagah, Dutch-Iranian Reza Ghoochannejhad, Swedish-Iranians Omid Nazari and Saman Ghoddos, and Iranian-American Steven Beitashour among others.

Iran competed in Group F alongside Argentina, Nigeria and Bosnia and Herzegovina. Prior to the tournament, they founded the Central Asian Football Association.

In the opening match of the tournament on 16 June, Iran drew Nigeria 0–0 making it their first clean sheet in the World Cup. In their next match, Iran was defeated by Argentina 1–0 with a late goal from Lionel Messi and received praise after holding Argentina for 90 minutes while creating some attacking opportunities of their own. Iran was eliminated from the tournament in their next game, a 3–1 defeat to Bosnia and Herzegovina. Iran's lone goal was scored by Reza Ghoochannejhad. After the tournament, Queiroz declared he would resign as manager of Iran but later switched and extended his contract until the 2018 FIFA World Cup.

Late 2010s
Iran qualified for the 2015 AFC Asian Cup as group winners where Team Melli were the highest ranked seed. Iran faced Bahrain, Qatar and the UAE in Group C.

With the second highest number of fans in the tournament after hosts Australia, the Iranians defeated Bahrain 2–0 with limited preparations. A defensive-minded Iran then defeated Qatar 1–0 thanks to a Sardar Azmoun goal before defeating UAE by the same scoreline to reach the top of their group.

In the quarter-finals Iran faced Iraq who they had beaten weeks prior in a friendly match. Having received a controversial red card in the first half, Iran competed with ten men, managing to score goals late in extra time to draw the match 3–3. In the ensuing penalty shootout, Iran lost 7–6.

Iran began their 2018 FIFA World Cup qualification campaign with friendly matches against Chile and Sweden in March 2015. Queiroz resigned from his managerial post thereafter due to disagreements with the Iranian Football Federation. On 14 April 2015, Iran were drawn with Oman, India, Turkmenistan and Guam in the second round of qualifiers. On 26 April, Queiroz announced that he would continue as the manager of Iran for their 2018 World Cup campaign.

Iran became the second team to qualify for the 2018 World Cup after a 2–0 win at home over Uzbekistan on 12 June 2017. They also clinched first place in their qualification group after South Korea's defeat to Qatar.

Iran won the first match against Morocco after Aziz Bouhaddouz scoring an own goal. They then lost against Spain with a goal scored by Diego Costa, with video assistant referees denying an Iranian equalizer. The third match against Portugal ended in a draw after a penalty scored by Karim Ansarifard and because Morocco could only manage a 2–2 draw to Spain, Iran were eliminated. Iran's four points is the most received in any World Cup appearance.

Having qualified for the 2019 AFC Asian Cup earlier, Iran was drawn into group D, where they shared fate with Iraq, Vietnam and Yemen. Iran opened their tournament against Yemen slower and almost conceded a goal but after 10 minutes, Iran regained the ground and proved more dominant in certain aspects, thrashing Yemen 5–0. A 2–0 win over the Vietnamese side gave Iran direct qualification to the knockout stage. Iran ended their group stage with a goalless draw over neighbor Iraq and took first place. After the group stage, Iran encountered Oman, with a defending mistake almost costing Iran's chances but Ahmed Mubarak Al-Mahaijri's penalty was saved by Alireza Beiranvand. Iran then defeated Oman 2–0 to reach the last eight. In the quarter-finals against a defensive China, Iran outclassed the Chinese 3–0 to meet Japan in the semi-finals. Iran missed the opportunity to reach the final once again when they fell 3–0 with all three goals scored in second half.

Early 2020s

Iran was the highest-ranked team to be seeded in the 2022 FIFA World Cup qualification. Iran was drawn into the second round where they would have to deal with two Arab countries, Iraq and Bahrain, along with Cambodia and Hong Kong. Iran, under new Belgian manager Marc Wilmots, began with a 2–0 win over Hong Kong away. After the death of Sahar Khodayari, the 14–0 win over Cambodia allowed select Iranian women to enter the stadium for the first time since the 1979 Islamic Revolution. Their next away encounters against Bahrain and Iraq went on to be consecutive defeats which Iran lost 0–1 and 1–2, respectively. Following two consecutive draws between Iraq and Bahrain, Iran was left with the possibility of being eliminated from the World Cup outright in the second round, leading to the sacking of Marc Wilmots.

The COVID-19 pandemic in Iran forced the remaining fixtures to be played without spectators in June 2021, forcing Iran to play their remaining games in Bahrain under new coach Dragan Skočić; but with Bahrain losing its home support as an advantage, and Iraq assured a place in the final phase, Iran was able to stage a comeback, occupying first place and, together with Iraq, progressed to the final phase.

Iran became the thirteenth team to qualify for the 2022 FIFA World Cup after a 1–0 win at home over Iraq on 27 January 2022. In March 2022, Iranian women were again banned from entering the stadium for a World Cup qualifier. Iran's World Cup preparation friendly match against Canada at BC Place in June 2022 was cancelled by the Canadian Soccer Association amid opposition and mounting criticism, namely in regards to the Iranian government's role in shooting down Ukraine International Airlines Flight 752.

By the start of the World Cup in Qatar, Iran was the highest ranked team from Asia. In October 2022, calls were made to ban the Iranian national team from the World Cup for the Iranian government's blocking of Iranian women from their stadiums, their supplying of weapons to Russia during the invasion of Ukraine, and the treatment towards protesters during the Mahsa Amini protests. However, Iran started its World Cup campaign with a nightmare, losing 2–6 to England in the opening game as Iran suffered the worst ever loss in its FIFA World Cup history. The Iranian team notably made headlines in their opening match against England after refusing to sing the national anthem in solidarity with the Mahsa Amini protests, with some Iranian supporters cheering against their own team or boycotting their team amidst the ongoing protests as they felt the team was representing the government.

In the following match against Wales, amidst the boos and whistles from the Iranian supporters during the playing of the national anthem, the Iranian players were filmed singing the national anthem before defeating Wales 2–0 for their first-ever win over a European nation at the World Cup, with some protestors having their pre-revolutionary Lion and Sun flags and Women, Life, Freedom banners snatched from them by pro-government fans and stadium security at the Ahmad bin Ali Stadium. Protesters were harassed by government supporters with some protesters being detained by Qatari police, while stadium security confirmed they were given orders to confiscate anything but the flag of the Islamic Republic of Iran. Documents obtained by Iran International showed Iran was coordinating secret efforts with Qatar to control who attends the World Cup and restrict any signs of dissent.

Ahead of Iran's final group stage match against the United States, the Iranian players were reportedly called in to a meeting with members of the IRGC and were threatened with violence and torture for their families if they did not sing the national anthem or joined the protests against the Iranian regime. During the match, the Iranian players sang the national anthem again before losing to the United States 1–0 for the first time in their history and thereby being knocked out of the tournament. Many Iranians celebrated the defeat and one Iranian man was killed by security forces in Bandar-e Anzali after honking his car horn in celebration. Another Iranian fan was also arrested by Qatari police after he was wearing a shirt with the Woman, Life, Freedom slogan.

Team image

Nicknames
The Iranian national team has received several nicknames by supporters and media. The most common one used is "Team Melli", meaning "The National Team" in Persian language. Although the Iranian supporters have popularized "Team Melli", other nicknames for the team include "Persian Stars" (entitled since the World Cup 2006) "Shiran e Iran", meaning "The Iranian Lions" or "The Lions of Persia", "Shirdilan", "Lion Hearts" and "Princes of Persia" (used since AFC Asian Cup 2011). Iran's slogan for the 2014 FIFA World Cup was Honour of Persia, selected in an internet poll held by FIFA. A more recently used nickname, due to the presence of the Asiatic cheetah on the 2014 World Cup jersey, is Youzpalangan which means "The Cheetahs".

Kits and crests

Traditionally, Iran national football team's home kit is white, and the away kit is red. Sometimes, green shirts with white shorts and red socks are used.

Kit suppliers
The table below shows the history of kit supplier for the Iranian national football team.

Sponsorship

On 1 February 2014, Iran announced the addition of the endangered Asiatic cheetah on their 2014 FIFA World Cup kits in order to bring attention to its conservation efforts.

Rivalries

Iran and Iraq are neighboring rivals, sharing a history. According to the Malay Mail, "Emotions are always high when Iran and Iraq meet on the football pitch". In the contemporary era, especially during the reign of Saddam Hussein, the two countries had worsened relations and fought the Iran–Iraq War for 8 years. In 2001, for the first time in decades, an Iran-Iraq match was not held at a neutral venue. The rivalry was escalated after Iraq knocked Iran out of the 2015 AFC Asian Cup in controversial circumstances. Iran leads the series with 17 wins, 7 draws and 6 losses.

Iran and Saudi Arabia are ideological rivals. The game was ranked eighth in Goal.com's 2010 list of "Football's 10 Greatest International Rivalries". and ninth in Bleacher Report's 2014 list of "International Football's 10 Most Politically-Charged Football Rivalries" All of their matches have been competitive; none of them were friendlies. The first match was played on 24 August 1975, with Iran defeating Saudi Arabia 3–0. Iran leads the series with 5 wins, 6 draws and 4 losses.

Iran and South Korea are top Asian rivals with over 50 years of history. As two of the leading competitors on the continent in the 1970s, the Korea-Iran rivalry is among the most storied in Asian football. Since their initial meeting in the 1958 Asian Games, they have faced off in a total of 32 games. Korea frequently held the upper hand in the early years of the competition, but things started to shift in the twenty-first century. Iran has triumphed six times since 2006, while Korea has only defeated them once—by a score of 1-0 at the Asian Cup in 2011. Before Korea recovered its footing in 2017 and pushed the Middle Eastern team to a tie the past three times they faced off, Iran won four straight games after the 2011 Asian Cup.

Stadiums

Since 1972, Iran's national stadium has been Tehran's Azadi Stadium with a nominal capacity of 78,116 spectators. Azadi Stadium is the 28th largest association football stadium in the world, seventh in Asia and first in West Asia. A record was set in Azadi for the 1998 FIFA World Cup qualifier against Australia with over 128,000 in attendance. Since 1979, the government restricts Iranian women from entering the stadiums. However, FIFA condemned the move and wrote to Iranian Football Federation in June 2019. The federation in their letter gave deadline to uplift the restrictions and let women enter the stadiums. On 25 August 2019, deputy Sports Minister Jamshid Taghizadeh stated: "Women can go to Tehran's Azadi stadium to watch the match between Iran's national team and Cambodia in October for the Qatar World Cup qualifier.” After the death of Sahar Khodayari, select Iranian women were allowed to attend the match against Cambodia in October 2019. However, in March 2022, Iranian women were again blocked from entering the stadium for a World Cup qualifier.

From 1942 to 1972, Amjadieh Stadium was Iran's national stadium. The other stadiums that Iran has been played international games are Bagh Shomal and Yadegar Emam Stadium (Tabriz), Takhti Stadium (Tehran), Enghelab Stadium (Karaj), Hafezieh Stadium (Shiraz), Takhti Stadium and Imam Reza Stadium (Mashhad).

The Iran National Football Camp is the team's training ground.

Results and fixtures

The following is a list of match results in the last 12 months, as well as any future matches that have been scheduled.

2022

2023

FIFA International match days 2020–2024

Coaching staff

Players

Current squad
The following 32 players have been called up for friendly matches against Russia and Kenya in March 2023.

Caps and goals updated as of 29 November 2022, after the match against United States.

Recent call-ups
The following players have been called up for the team in the last 12 months.

 PRE

 PRE

INJ Withdrew due to injury
PRE Preliminary squad / standby
RET Retired from the national team
SUS Serving suspension
WD Player withdrew from the squad due to a non-injury issue.
COV Injured because of COVID-19

Player records

Players in bold are still active with Iran.

Most capped players

Top goalscorers

Most capped goalkeepers

Captains

Competition records

FIFA World Cup

Olympic Games

AFC Asian Cup

Asian Games

WAFF Championship

1 Iran played their B team in this tournament however recognised as international "A" matches.

Head-to-head record

Last match updated:  on 29 November 2022.

 FIFA considers Russia as the inheritor of the records of Soviet Union.
 FIFA considers Serbia as the inheritor of the records of SFR Yugoslavia and FR Yugoslavia.
 FIFA considers Czech Republic as the inheritor of the records of Czechoslovakia.

FIFA World Rankings

Between December 2014 until May 2018, Iran was the highest-ranked team in Asia, the longest continuous period of time that a team has held that distinction.

 Highest FIFA ranking  15 (July 2005)
 Lowest FIFA ranking  122 (May 1996)
 Best mover  +65 (July 1996)
 Worst mover  –43 (October 1995)

Last update was on 01 January 2022

 Best Ranking   Worst Ranking   Best Mover   Worst Mover

Honours

Summary

Continental
 Asian Cup
 Champions: 1968, 1972, 1976
 Third place: 1980, 1988, 1996, 2004
Fourth place: 1984
Semi-finals: 2019
Asian Games
 Gold Medal: 1974, 1990, 1998, 2002
 Silver Medal: 1951, 1966

Regional
West Asian Football Federation Championship
 Champions: 2000, 2004, 2007*, 2008
 Runners-up: 2010
 Third place: 2002

ECO Cup
 Champions: 1965, 1970, 1993
 Runners-up: 1967, 1969, 1974**

* as B Team
** as Malavan F.C.

Intercontinental
AFC/OFC Challenge Cup
 Champions: 2003

Afro-Asian Cup of Nations

1978
 Runners-up: 1991

Minor tournaments
LG Cup:  4 Champions,  4 Third place
Minor Tournament:  5 Champions,  6 Runners-up,  4 Third place

See also
Football in Iran
Iran national futsal team
Iran national beach soccer team
Iran national under-23 football team
Iran national under-20 football team
Iran national under-17 football team
Iran women's national football team
Iran women's national under-20 football team
Iran women's national under-17 football team
Iran women's national futsal team
Tehran XI

Notes

References

External links

 
Iran profile at FIFA.com
Extensive archive of Team's results, squads, campaigns and players
Players Profile, Articles, Statistics and Gallery of National Team
RSSSF archive of results since 1941
RSSSF archive of most capped players and top goalscorers
Iran Team Qatar 2022

 

 
AFC Asian Cup-winning countries
Asian national association football teams
Football in Iran